Peter Anthony Libasci (born November 9, 1951) is an American prelate of the Roman Catholic Church who has been serving as bishop of the Diocese of Manchester in New Hampshire since 2011.  Libasci previously served as an auxiliary bishop of the Diocese of Rockville Centre in New York from 2007 to 2011.

Libasci is a bi-ritual priest, allowed to celebrate the Divine Liturgy and administer the sacraments in both the Latin Church and the Ruthenian Greek Catholic Church.

Biography

Early life and education
Peter A. Libasci was born on November 9. 1951, in Jackson Heights, Queens, New York. Libasci is of Italian (Sicilian) heritage on his paternal side and of Slovak heritage on his maternal side. He attended St. Margaret School in Middle Village, New York, followed by Cathedral Preparatory Seminary in Elmhurst, Queens. Libasci obtained a Bachelor of Philosophy degree from St. John's University in Queens and a Master of Divinity degree from Saint Meinrad School of Theology in Saint Meinrad, Indiana. After his ordination, Libasci  received a Master of Theology-Catechetical Ministry degree from St. John's.

Ordination and ministry
On April 1, 1978, Libasci was ordained a priest by Bishop John Raymond McGann for the Diocese of Rockville Centre. After his ordination, he had the following parish assignments in New York

 Parochial vicar at Saint Raymond's in East Rockaway (1978–1982),
 Parochial vicar at Saints Cyril and Methodius in Deer Park (1982–1988); 
 Parish administrator and then pastor at Our Lady of Good Counsel in Inwood (1988–2000)
 Pastor at Saint Therese of Lisieux in Montauk (2000 - 2007)

On December 10, 2004, Libasci was named honorary prelate by Pope John Paul II with the title of monsignor.

Auxiliary Bishop of Rockville Centre

Libasci was named titular bishop of Satafis and auxiliary bishop of the Diocese of Rockville Centre, on April 3, 2007, by Pope Benedict XVI. He received his episcopal consecration on June 1, 2007, from Bishop William Murphy, with auxiliary bishops Emil Wcela, Paul Walsh and John Dunne serving as co-consecrators.

As auxiliary bishop, Libasci was episcopal vicar for the Vicariate East (Suffolk County), of the diocese. He also celebrated the liturgy for the Ruthenian Catholic community, which celebrates liturgy in the Byzantine rite.

Bishop of Manchester
On September 19, 2011, Benedict XVI named Libasci as the tenth bishop of the Diocese of Manchester. He was installed on December 8, 2011.

On July 22, 2021, Libasci was named in a lawsuit accusing him of child molestation between 1983 and 1984 when he was parochial vicar at Saints Cyril and Methodius Parish School in New York. The accuser, then 12 or 13 years old, said that Libasci fondled his genitals on "numerous occasions", including one instance when the boy was setting up the altar for mass. The lawsuit also named the Sisters of St. Joseph, the religious order running the school at the time, of neglecting to prevent the abuse. Libasci denied the accusations.  On August 29, 2021, the Archdiocese of Boston announced a formal investigation into the accusations.  As of February 2023, the investigation is still ongoing.

See also

 Catholic Church hierarchy
 Catholic Church in the United States
 Historical list of the Catholic bishops of the United States
 List of Catholic bishops of the United States
 Lists of patriarchs, archbishops, and bishops

References

External links
Roman Catholic Diocese of Manchester
The Roman Catholic Diocese of Rockville Centre

Episcopal succession

1951 births
Living people
People from Jackson Heights, Queens
Roman Catholic Diocese of Rockville Centre
Roman Catholic bishops of Manchester
21st-century Roman Catholic bishops in the United States
People from Rockville Centre, New York
People from East Rockaway, New York
Religious leaders from New York (state)
Catholics from New York (state)
American people of Italian descent
American people of Slovak descent